"Estranged" is a song by American hard rock band Guns N' Roses, included on their 1991 album Use Your Illusion II. The song was released as a single in January 1994.

Background
At over nine minutes long, "Estranged", also known for its music video, is the longest song on Use Your Illusion II and Guns N' Roses' second longest song overall (after "Coma" from Use Your Illusion I). It has many verses, no set chorus, and several distinguished guitar and piano solos. Use Your Illusion II'''s liner notes thank lead guitarist Slash for "the killer guitar melodies", which captured Axl Rose's vision. Slash has specifically stated that recording the guitar parts for this song was very intensive for him; he recorded it using a Les Paul Gold Top, using the rhythm pickup with the tone turned all the way down.

According to Slash, the song was written while the band was rehearsing for an extended period of time in Chicago. Axl revealed that he wrote the song during a more "bummed out" time in his life when his marriage with Erin Everly was annulled.

Music video
Released in December 1993, the official music video (directed by Andy Morahan) is the third part of an unofficial Del James series of videos (preceded by "Don't Cry" and "November Rain") from the Use Your Illusion I and Use Your Illusion II albums. The estimated budget was $4 million. The video is similar in style to the previous two in the trilogy. Its live scenes were shot at Olympiastadion in Munich, Germany.

The song's video was placed on New York Times list of the "15 Essential Hair-Metal Videos".

 Description 
The video is the third and final chapter in Guns N' Roses' massively popular "November Rain music video trilogy" (preceded by  "Don't Cry" and "November Rain"). It was directed by Andy Morahan and written by frontman Axl Rose himself. While "Don't Cry" and "November Rain" have a strong similarity (they both stage a sort of motion picture film told in vignettes and following the story of a romantic relationship), "Estranged" has very little connection to the previous story of the two previous videos. This is mainly because by Axl Rose's then-girlfriend Stephanie Seymour (who played the vocalist's girlfriend in "Don't Cry" and "November Rain") had broken up with Rose before shooting the video, forcing him and the director to abandon the original plans for the shooting of "Estranged", thus leading to a thematic disconnection with the first two. However, this does not mean that the cinematic style was also lost, since "Estranged" has visuals that evoke the first two videos.

The video shows Axl Rose being arrested by a group of special police officers, then taken to a mental health clinic, as definitions of various emotional disorders are seen on the screen. The protagonist (Rose) talks to the therapists about his emotional problems; a topic that was depicted in the video for "Don't Cry". In the end, the protagonist is released from the clinic and heads to an abandoned ship at sea, where the story reaches its climax: Rose jumps into the water and swims with a group of dolphins, gaining inner peace by doing so.

 Reception 
"Estranged" is widely considered to be one of the band's best songs. In 2017, Paste ranked the song number two on their list of the 15 greatest Guns N' Roses songs, and in 2020, Kerrang ranked the song number four on their list of the 20 greatest Guns N' Roses songs.

Live performances
"Estranged" was played live very frequently during the Use Your Illusion Tour from 1991 to 1993. During performances of this song, Dizzy Reed would play piano instead of Axl Rose. A live version of this song can be heard on Live Era: '87-'93. During the Chinese Democracy Tour, a riff from the song was sometimes included in Ron Thal's solo interpretation of the Pink Panther Theme. In December 2008, Axl spoke of his desire to bring Estranged back into the live set. The song was featured with regularity on the tour from 2011-2014. A recording was issued on the Appetite for Democracy 3D'' video. It was played at almost every show on the "Not in This Lifetime... Tour".

Track listing

Personnel
 W. Axl Rose – lead vocals, piano
 Slash – lead guitar
 Izzy Stradlin – rhythm guitar, additional lead guitar
 Duff McKagan – bass
 Matt Sorum – drums

Charts

See also
 List of most expensive music videos

References

External links
  "Estranged" -- a music video retrospective

1991 songs
1994 singles
Geffen Records singles
Guns N' Roses songs
Music videos directed by Andy Morahan
Song recordings produced by Mike Clink
Songs written by Axl Rose
American progressive rock songs